Dither is a process used in digital signal processing.
Dither may also refer to:
 Dither fish, a term used by aquarists for certain types of fish
 Dither (album), an album by the rock group moe.